Shiraz Sumar (born 1950) was a Tanzanian cricketer. He played one One day International representing East Africa in the 1975 World Cup.

External link
 Shiraz Sumar Cricinfo 

1950 births
Living people
Tanzanian cricketers
East Africa One Day International cricketers
Cricketers at the 1975 Cricket World Cup